Hongyancun station is a station on Line 9 of Chongqing Rail Transit in Chongqing municipality, China, which opened in 2022. It is located in Yuzhong District. Line 5 will also reach this station once the construction of the Central section is finished.

This station is the deepest metro station in China. The deepest point of this station is 116 meters below the ground. With the top of rail 106 meters below the surface. Regardless this depth breaks China's the record depth of Line 10's Hongtudi station and surpasses the depth of the Kyiv Metro's Arsenalna station, the previous deepest metro station record holder.

See also
Hongyancun Museum

References

Railway stations in Chongqing
Railway stations in China opened in 2022
Chongqing Rail Transit stations